Yermolovo is a rural locality (a village) in Mayskoye Rural Settlement, Vologodsky District, Vologda Oblast, Russia. The population was 5 as of 2002.

Geography 
The distance to Vologda is 12.6 km, to Maysky is 3 km. Salkovo, Pankino, Maryinskoye, Nagorskoye, Nikulino, Popovka, Terentyevskoye are the nearest rural localities.

References 

Rural localities in Vologodsky District